Lerbach is a village of Osterode am Harz in Lower Saxony, Germany. It is based in the south-western part of the Harz mountains.

People 
 Wilhelm Kolle (1868-1935),  bacteriologist and hygienist

References

 
Towns in the Harz
Göttingen (district)